Rabisankar Bal (1962–2017) was an Indian writer in the Bengali-language. He lived in Kolkata, and was a journalist by profession. He published more than twenty books in a range of genres including novels, short stories, poetry and essays. He is best known for novels such as Dozakhnama (Conversations in Hell) and Aynajibon (A Mirrored Life), both of which have been translated into English by Arunava Sinha. He is regarded as a major voice in contemporary Bengali literature and won a number of prizes for his work.

Rabisankar Bal penned down 15 novels and 5 short story collection over a period of 30 years.  He also translated Saadat Hasan Manto's work in Bengali.

Bal received West Bengal government's Sutapa Roychowdhury Memorial Prize for his novel "The Biography of Midnight".

At the age of 55, following a brief illness, Rabisankar Bal breathed his last in B. R. Singh Hospital, Kolkata.

Works

Collection of Stories (গল্পগ্রন্থ)
 দারুনিরঞ্জন 
 রবিশঙ্কর বল এর গল্প 
 আর্তোর শেষ অভিনয় 
 জীবন অন্যত্র 
 ওই মণিময় তার কাহিনী 
 সেরা ৫০ টি গল্প

Novels (উপন্যাস)
 নীল দরজা লাল ঘর 
 পোখরান ৯৮ 
 পাণ্ডুলিপি করে আয়োজন 
 বাসস্টপে একদিন 
 মিলনের শ্বাসরোধী  কথা 
 নষ্টভ্রষ্ট 
 এখানে তুষার ঝরে 
 দোজখনামা 
 আয়নাজীবন 
 আঙুরবাগানে খুন 
 জিরো আওয়ার 
 মধ্যরাত্রির জীবনী

Collection of Poems (কবিতা)
 হেমন্তের এলিজি
 ত্রস্ত নীলিমা 
 ঊনপঞ্চাশ বায়ু

Non Fiction (প্রবন্ধ)
 সংলাপের মধ্যবর্তী এই নীরবতা 
 কুষ্ঠরোগীদের গুহায় সংগীত 
 মুখ আর মুখোশ 
 জীবনানন্দ ও অন্যান্য

Edited and Translated Books (সম্পাদিত গ্রন্থ)
 সাদাত হোসেইন মন্টো রচনাসংগ্রহ

References

External links
 Rabisankar Bal at Penguin India

Bengali Hindus
Bengali novelists
Bengali male poets
Bengali poets
20th-century Bengali poets
21st-century Bengali poets
20th-century Bengalis
21st-century Bengalis
1962 births
2017 deaths
Writers from Kolkata
Indian novelists
Indian male novelists
Indian male writers
Indian poets
Indian male poets
Indian essayists
Indian male essayists
Indian non-fiction writers
Indian male non-fiction writers
Indian short story writers
Indian male short story writers
Indian translators
Poets from West Bengal
Bengali-language writers
Novelists from West Bengal
20th-century Indian poets
20th-century Indian novelists
20th-century Indian essayists
20th-century Indian translators
20th-century Indian short story writers
20th-century Indian non-fiction writers
20th-century Indian writers
20th-century Indian male writers
21st-century Indian writers
21st-century Indian male writers
21st-century Indian novelists
21st-century Indian translators
21st-century Indian short story writers
21st-century Indian non-fiction writers
21st-century Indian poets
21st-century Indian essayists